Enfield is an unincorporated community in King William County, Virginia, United States.

Seven Springs was listed on the National Register of Historic Places in 1978.

References

Unincorporated communities in Virginia
Unincorporated communities in King William County, Virginia